This is a list of military aircraft currently in service with the Russian Air Force as of 2022. It belongs under larger Russian Aerospace Forces branch, established on 1 August 2015 with merging of the Russian Air Force and the Russian Aerospace Defence Forces.

Aircraft

Current inventory

See also
 List of active Russian military aircraft
 List of military aircraft of the Soviet Union and the CIS
 Lists of currently active military equipment by country

References

Russian
Russia
Russian and Soviet military-related lists